Edward Fanning (16 March 1848 – 30 November 1917) was an Australian cricketer. He played one first-class cricket match for Victoria in 1873.

See also
 List of Victoria first-class cricketers

References

External links
 

1848 births
1917 deaths
Australian cricketers
Victoria cricketers
Cricketers from Sydney
Melbourne Cricket Club cricketers